The Thudaka Range is a mountain range located east of the Rocky Mountain Trench in British Columbia, Canada bounded by the Obo River on the east, the Frog River on the west, and on the south by the pass between Geese and Thudaka Creeks. The range is part of the Stikine Ranges.

See also
List of mountain ranges

References

Stikine Ranges
Cassiar Country